The 2022 Split district elections were held on 4 September 2022 for the councils of 27 city districts and seven local committees of Split.

Candidates 
The Electoral Commission for the implementation of elections for council members of local committees and city districts in the area of the City of Split published valid candidate lists on August 8, 2022.

Results

See also 
 2021 Split local elections
 2022 Split local elections

References

Note list 

Split district 2022
Split district 
Split, Croatia
History of Split, Croatia